The IWA Television Championship, formally known as the IWA Extreme Cruiserweight Championship, was a title defended in the International Wrestling Association in Puerto Rico.

History
It was replaced the IWA World Junior Heavyweight Championship on November 25, 2006 by GM Orlando Toledo. Later renamed "IWA Extreme Combat Division Championship" in 2009, "IWA Television Championship" on June 4, 2011 and "IWA Yoú Tu Championship" in January 2012.

Title history

Name History

Combined reigns

References 

International Wrestling Association (Puerto Rico) championships
Cruiserweight wrestling championships
Hardcore wrestling championships
Television wrestling championships
Unsanctioned championships